Todd Oldham (born Jacky Todd Oldham; October 22, 1961) is an American-born designer and president of L-7 Designs Inc and Todd Oldham Studios. His approach to fashion and style has become known to millions through his fashion lines, interior designs, books and by appearing in television shows. Oldham is based in New York City.

Biography

Early life 
Oldham was born Jacky Todd Oldham in Corpus Christi, Texas, in 1961 to Jack and Linda Oldham. He has two sisters and one brother. At age 15, he designed his first dress when he stitched together some pillowcases. His father was a computer programmer and the family moved around due to his father’s job, including a four-year stint in Iran when Oldham was 12. He moved to Dallas, Texas, after graduating high school. His first job was in the alterations department at the Polo Ralph Lauren.  He borrowed $50 from his parents, bought 41 yards of white cotton jersey, dyed it and put together a tiny collection that he sold to Neiman Marcus.

Career

During his early days in Dallas, Oldham showed his first collection in 1981, launched his first clothing line in 1989 and won the Council of Fashion Designer Perry Ellis Award for New Fashion Talent in 1991. In 1988, Oldham moved to New York City with his business partner, Tony Longoria. Oldham served as creative consultant to Escada between 1995 and 1997. He launched a perfume line in 1995 and designed a clothing line for Target (2002–2003). In 1995, he produced a clothing line associated with the Warner Brothers film Batman Forever. Oldham designed furniture and home accessories for La-Z-Boy furniture (2003–2007) and served as creative director for Old Navy. He designed under his own label in New York from 1989-1999. When he left the fashion industry, he dispersed his archive to the Texas Fashion Collection and the RISD Museum, which held the 2016 exhibition "All of Everything: Todd Oldham Fashion," a retrospective of his fashion career.

Oldham designed The Hotel of South Beach in 1999. He is currently designing the annex to the hotel.

Todd Oldham has become widely known to American TV audiences through his many television appearances. Most notably, Oldham was the host of the "Todd Time" segment on MTV's House of Style from 1993 to 1999. His appearances on House of Style has been credited with advancing his career during the 1990s. He has also hosted Fashionably Loud on MTV in 1999 and recently served as mentor to contestants on Bravo's Top Design.

Oldham is also actively involved in book publishing. He has produced a number of books on various aspects of style for Ammo Books as part of the Place Space series. Books in the series include photos and essays on filmmaker John Waters, the artist compound in upstate New York owned by Joe Holtzman (the founder of Nest magazine), and the Rhode Island School of Design's off-campus housing and Bedrock City. Oldham has created Hand Made Modern, Without Boundaries, and various other titles. In June 2007, Oldham released a monograph of artist Charley Harper’s work titled An Illustrated Life. He has subsequently released monographs on Wayne White and Ed Emberley.

Philanthropy 
Oldham is on the advisory board of the Amazon Conservation Team (ACT), to work in partnership with indigenous people in conserving biodiversity, health and culture in South America. He is also on the board of Aperture, a nonprofit foundation dedicated to promoting photography. Oldham has been involved with Habitat for Humanity, Bailey House, the oldest supportive housing program for persons with HIV and AIDS in the United States, and People for the Ethical Treatment of Animals.

Personal life
Oldham is openly gay. His longtime partner is Tony Longoria.

See also
 LGBT culture in New York City
 List of LGBT people from New York City

References

External links

Todd Oldham – Spontaneous Creations in Modern Furniture
Todd Olhdam records, 1990-2005 from The Irene Lewisohn Costume Reference Library at The Costume Institute, The Metropolitan Museum of Art.

1961 births
American fashion designers
American interior designers
American gay artists
LGBT fashion designers
LGBT people from Texas
Living people
Stonewall Book Award winners